The Private International Law (Miscellaneous Provisions) Act 1995 (c 42) is an Act of the Parliament of the United Kingdom.

The Act is made up of several parts.  The three principal parts regulate:
 Interest on judgment debts and arbitral awards
 Validity of marriages under a law which permits polygamy
 Choice of law in tort and delict

Interest
The first part inserts a new provision into the Administration of Justice Act 1970 and the County Courts Act 1984 permitting interest to be awarded by the courts on judgments issued in a currency other than sterling, and then updates the relevant section which relate to equivalent provisions in the Arbitration Act 1950 for arbitration awards.

Polygamous marriages

Section 5(1) affirms that:

Section 6 gives the section retroactive effect, and section 7 applies equivalent provisions to Scotland.

Section 8(1) confirms that "Nothing in this Part affects any law or custom relating to the marriage of members of the Royal Family."

Choice of law in tort

Part III regulates choice of law for tort and delict.  Section 9(2) states "The characterisation for the purposes of private international law of issues arising in a claim as issues relating to tort or delict is a matter for the courts of the forum", which replicates the common law position in relation to that issue.

Section 10 abrogates the common law rule on double actionability from the case of Phillips v Eyre (1870) LR 6 QB 1.

Section 11 lays down the new rule, that the choice of law for tort and delict shall be the lex loci delicti commissi ("place where the wrong occurred").  Subsection (2) clarifies that where the tort occurs across different countries:
 in relation to personal injury or death resulting from personal injury, it is the law of the country where the individual was when he sustained the injury;
 in relation to damage to property, it is the law of the country where the property was when it was damaged; and
 in any other case, it is the law of the country in which the most significant element or elements of those events occurred.

Section 12 creates a "flexible exception" where the tort is overwhelmingly more connected with another country to that indicated by section 11.

Section 13 creates a general exception for libel and slander.  Defamation continues to be regulated by the common law rules and still requires double actionability.  This was felt necessary to protect British newspapers from being sued under draconian defamation laws overseas.

References
 These sources are available under the  Open Government Licence v3.0. © Crown copyright.

External links
The Private International Law (Miscellaneous Provisions) Act 1995, as amended, from the National Archives.
The Private International Law (Miscellaneous Provisions) Act 1995, as originally enacted, from the National Archives.

United Kingdom Acts of Parliament 1995